Catlowdy is a hamlet in Cumbria, England. It contains the Bessiestown Country Guest House.

References

Hamlets in Cumbria
City of Carlisle